= Dafydd Baentiwr =

Welsh poet

Dafydd Baentiwr was a 16th-century Welsh poet. A bardic controversy (ymryson) contains his only known surviving works (a poem written by Dafydd to Gruffydd, a poem written by Gruffydd in reply, and another poem written by Dafydd).
